Here & Now are an English psychedelic/space rock band formed in early 1974. They have close connections with the band Gong and in 1977/1978 worked with Gong's Daevid Allen and Gilli Smyth under the name Planet Gong.

History

The first version of the group was co-founded in London by drummer/vocalist Keith Dobson, guitarist/keyboardist José Gross, bassist Franco and others in March 1974. By 1975 the line-up featured Dobson/Kif Kif Le Batteur (drums/vocals), Steffe Sharpstrings (guitar), Paul 'Twink' Noble (synths) and Keith Tha Missile (bass).

In 1977, Daevid Allen and Gilli Smyth recruited the band to tour with them under the name Planet Gong, and this combination released a live album Live Floating Anarchy 1977 and a single "Opium for the People". The musicians who played on Live Floating Anarchy 1977 were:
 Steffe Sharpstrings (Stephan Lewry) - guitar
 Keith Tha Missile Bass (Keith Bailey) - bass
 Kif Kif Le Batteur (Keith Dobson) - drums/vocals
 Gavin Da Blitz (Gavin Allardyce) - synths
 Suze Da Blooz (Susan Allport) & Ano Wombat (Ano Graver) - dancing/vocals
 Gilli Smyth - vocals
 Dingbat Alien (Daevid Allen) - guitar/vocals

Kif Kif, Suze and Ano left the band by January 1979; Graver to join Alternative TV, Allport sang with The Androids of Mu, while Dobson fronted the cult 1980s post-punk bands The 012 and World Domination Enterprises. He was replaced initially by Rob Bougie. Here & Now continued into the 1980s around the nucleus of Keith and Gavin, with (following Steffe's departure) Dean Gaisburgh-Watkyn on guitar and Paul Rose on drums. Gavin left the band in the early 1990s but, following a 'Planet Gong' reunion tour, Steffe subsequently rejoined and brought in drummer Steve Cassidy (until 2007). 

Steffe left Here & Now again in 2009. He has continued to work with Steve Cassidy on various fusion projects and contributed to Joie Hinton projects. He is now concentrating on solo work and his long-time involvement in Visitation Arena with Cher Newsam.

Here & Now continues to tour as a loose collective under the leadership of Keith Tha Bass.

Band members
 Kif Kif Le Batteur (Keith Dobson) – drums/vocals (1974–1978) + ~
 José Gross – guitar/keyboards (1974–1975) ^ +
 Chris Kelleher – violin (1974–1975) ^
 Franco – bass (1974)
 Marguerita – vocals (1974)
 Drucilla – ? (1974)
 Joleon Buchanan – guitar (1974–1975)
 Nick Reiter – bass (1974–1975) ^
 Richard Heley – vocals (1974–1975) ^
 Hugh – flute (1974–1975)
 Twink (Paul Noble) – keyboards (1974–1977) ~
 Alan Dogend – ? (1974–1975) +
 Steffe Sharpstrings (Stephan Lewry) – guitar/vocals (1975–1981, 1992–2009) ~
 Keith Tha Missile Bass (Keith Bailey) – bass/vocals (1975–1976, 1976– )
 Max Cann – bass (1976)
 Suze Da Blooze (Susan Allport) – dancing/vocals (1976–1979)
 Gavin Da Blitz (Gavin Allardyce) – keyboards/vocals (1977–1990)
 Ano Wombat (Ano Graver) – dancing/vocals (1977–1979)
 Jack The Sax (Jack Neat) – saxophone (1978)
 Rob Bougie – drums (1979–1982)
 Bernie Elliott – guitar (1979–1980)
 Deano Ferrari (Dean Gaisburgh-Watkyn) – guitar/vocals (1981–1992)
 Rob Peters – drums (1982–1983)
 Paul Rose – drums (1983–1986)
 Pete Davis – drums (1986–1991)
 J.C. (Jonathan Lambert) – saxophone (1986–1989)
 Dominic Luckman – drums (1991)
 Nick Danger – drums (1991)
 Andy Roid – keyboards/vocals (1991–1997, 2011–2019)
 Steve Cassidy – drums (1991–2007)
 Joie Hinton – keyboards (2003–2009)
 Merv Pepler – drums (2007–2009)
 Slim Verhoef – guitar (2009–2017)
 Gwyo Ze Pix (Howard Scarr) – keyboards (2009–2010)
 Nik Nimbus – drums (2009–2013)
 Mark Robson – keyboards/vocals (2011– )
 Stephen 'Woody' Wood – drums (2013–2017)
 Andy Burrows – guitar/vocals (2017– )
 Gem Quinn – drums/vocals (2017– )

^ formed Blank Space in 1975; + formed The 012 in 1979; ~ formed Ici Maintenants 2001-2007

Timeline

Discography
 Bristol Gardens (Live CD, recorded 1977) (Free Love Records)
 Rivington Pike  (Live CD, recorded 1977) (Free Love Records)
 Rivington Pike 2 (Live CD, recorded 1977) (Free Love Records)
 Oxford Poly (Live CD, recorded with Daevid Allen 1977) (Free Love Records)
 Live Floating Anarchy 1977 (as "Planet Gong", 1977)
 Give and Take (1978)
 Dog in Hell (EP, 1978)
 What You See... Is What You Are (LP shared with Alternative TV, 1978) (Deptford Fun City, DLP 02)
 All Over the Show (1979)
 Off The Cuff (Live Recordings 1979 - cassette only)
 Stolen Moments (early 80's - cassette only)
 Fantasy Shift (1983)
 Theatre (1984)
 Been & Gone (1986)
 Standing Forever (EP, 1989)
 UFOasis (1995)
 Gospel of Free (recorded 1976 to 1978, released in 1999)
 Space and Time (as "Ici Maintenants") 2001/2003 (Free Love Records)
 Wild and Free (1976 line-up re-union live, released 2007) (Free Love Records)
 Coaxed out from Oxford (originally on tape, released on CD in 2009)
 Live in London (2007 concert at Dingwalls, released in 2013)

References

External links
 Free Love Records
 Saracen
 Jose's The Recording Workshop
 Planet Gong Archives: Here & Now

English rock music groups
Musical groups established in 1974
Counterculture festivals activists